The 1966 Prince Edward Island general election was held on May 30, 1966.

The election in the riding of 1st Kings was delayed until July 11, 1966 due to the death of Liberal Assemblyman and candidate William Acorn.  As it turned out, other ridings elected a total of 15 Liberals and 15 Progressive Conservatives, and the riding of 1st Kings would by itself decide the general election.

The outgoing Progressive Conservative government attempted to win 1st Kings by resorting to such methods as naming one of the PC candidates (Keith Mackenzie) as Minister of Transports, and paving 30 miles of road in the district.  At the time, a reporter from the Charlottetown Guardian commented on how "the riding may well sink under the weight of the [paving] machines".  The strategy failed as both Liberal candidates in 1st Kings ultimately won, giving the Liberals a 17 to 15 majority and enabling Liberal leader Alex Campbell to become Premier.

The 1966 election was the first following the splitting of the 5th Queens district. The Progressive Conservative government decided to break with the tradition of each county having five ridings and ten members; by splitting 5th Queens, it gave the city of Charlottetown two ridings and therefore four members; and gave Queen's County a sixth district. This was the single biggest change to the map since 1893 when the ridings were devised. In that time population shifts had made some changes needed, as Charlottetown's population was more than five times that of some of the more rural ridings. The Progressive Conservatives had hoped that traditionally Progressive Conservative Charlottetown would vote in two additional Progressive Conservative members to the legislature; on election day the new riding elected two Progressive Conservatives, but the now modified old riding (Fifth Queen's) elected two Liberals.

Party Standings

Electoral reform
The Legislature of Prince Edward Island had two levels of membership from 1893 to 1996 - Assemblymen and Councillors. This was a holdover from when the Island had a bicameral legislature, the General Assembly and the Legislative Council.

In 1893, the Legislative Council was abolished and had its membership merged with the Assembly, though the two titles remained separate and were elected by different electoral franchises. Assembleymen were elected by eligible voters within a district. Up until past the 1962 election, Councillors were only elected by landowners within a district. 

The Shaw government passed an Act in 1963, eliminating this requirement.

Henceforth, until multi-member seats were abolished (1996), the Assemblyman and the Councillor in each district would be elected by universal adult suffrage identically.  But each seat would be filled in separate contest, through First past the post. The separate contests were  held that way despite the fact that the members would sit in the same chamber. They ensured that in each contest a party would run just one candidate so no candidate had to run against others of the same party as would have happened in a one-ballot, multi-member district. It also allowed one contest to be between Catholics of various arties and the other contest to be between Protestants of various parties.

As well the ability of a voter to cast multiple votes in a contest was discontinued. Henceforth the rule would be "one man, one vote" or actually "one man, two votes".

Members Elected

Kings

Prince

Queens

References

Further reading
 

1966 elections in Canada
Elections in Prince Edward Island
1966 in Prince Edward Island
May 1966 events in Canada